The Australia women's national under-23 soccer team represents Australia in international under-23 soccer and at the AFF Women's Championship. The team is controlled by the governing body for soccer in Australia, Football Australia (FA), which is currently a member of the Asian Football Confederation (AFC) and the regional ASEAN Football Federation (AFF) since leaving the Oceania Football Confederation (OFC) in 2006. The team's official nickname is the U23 Matildas.

Coaches
  Melissa Andreatta (2022–present)

Players

Current squad

The following players were named to the squad for the 2022 AFF Women's Championship.

Caps and goals are current as of July 12, 2022, after match against Malaysia.

Recent call-ups
The following players were named to a squad in the last 12 months.

Notes:
 PRE Preliminary squad / on stand-by.
 TOP Train-on player.
 INJ Withdrew due to an injury.

Results and fixtures

The following is a list of match results in the last 12 months, as well as any future matches that have been scheduled.

Legend

2022

Competitive record

AFF Women's Championship

See also
Sport in Australia
Football in Australia
Australia women's national soccer team
Australia women's national under-20 soccer team
Australia women's national under-17 soccer team

References

Asian women's national under-23 association football teams
Women's national under-23 association football teams
National youth sports teams of Australia